Newton Stewart RFC is a rugby union club based in Bladnoch, Wigtownshire, Scotland.

History
The club was founded in 1984 by rugby players from the Machars area of Wigtownshire.

The club plays an annual derby match with Wigtownshire RFC for the Spice Cup.

The second XV plays for the Galloway Quaich.

Sides
Newton Stewart runs various men's, women's, and age-group boys' and girls' sides.

Newton Stewart Sevens
The club runs the Newton Stewart Sevens tournament. Teams play for the Bladnoch Quaich.

Honours
 Glasgow District League
 Champions (1): 1996-97
 Newton Stewart Sevens
 Champions (1): 2018
 Leith Sevens
 Champions (1): 2022

Notable former player
Robbie Smith represented Glasgow Warriors at professional level.

References

Rugby union in Dumfries and Galloway
Scottish rugby union teams
Newton Stewart